The World Photography Organisation is a global platform for photography initiatives and helps artists working in photography broaden the conversation around their work. Established in 2007 by CEO Scott Gray, in the United kingdom it involves people and organisations from more than 180 countries.

The World Photography Organisation hosts a year-round portfolio of events including the Sony World Photography Awards, and Photofairs—art fairs dedicated to presenting fine art photography and moving image.

The company also creates, produces and delivers photographic events for a variety of partners, from exhibitions of individual artists, to platforms on the subject of photography involving artists, and curators from over 20 countries.

Sony World Photography Awards

Created by the World Photography Organisation, the Sony World Photography Awards are held annually. The awards are for photography from the past year and across a variety of photographic genres. 

More than 1.5 million images from 200+ countries and territories have been entered to the awards since their inception.

Competitions, jury and academy 
The Sony World Photography Awards features four competitions:

 Professional – bodies of work across 10 categories
 Open – the best single images across 10 categories
 Youth – work from young photographers aged 12 to 19
 Student – work from photography students

The awards are judged annually by museum and gallery directors, curators, publishers, writers and artists. They are also supported by the World Photographic Academy.

Outstanding Contribution to Photography 

Each year the Sony World Photography Awards honor one selected person / chosen people with its Outstanding Contribution to Photography prize. Past recipients of this prize include:

 2008: Phil Stern
 2009: Marc Riboud
 2010: Eve Arnold
 2011: Bruce Davidson
 2012: William Klein
 2013: William Eggleston
 2014: Mary Ellen Mark
 2015: Elliott Erwitt
 2016: Rong Rong & inri
 2017: Martin Parr
 2018: Candida Höfer
2019: Nadav Kander
2020: Gerhard Steidl
 2021: Graciela Iturbide
2022: Edward Burtynsky

Photographer of the Year
This is awarded to the overall winner.
 2008: Vanessa Winship
 2009: David Zimmerman
 2010 Tomasso Ausili
 2011: Alejandro Chaskielberg
 2012: Mitch Dobrowner
 2013: Andrea Gjestvang
 2014: Sara Naomi Lewkowicz
 2015: John Moore
 2016: Asghar Khamseh
 2017: Frederik Buyckx
 2018: Alys Tomlinson
 2019: Federico Borella
 2020: Pablo Albarenga
 2021: Craig Easton

Award ceremony, prizes and exhibition 

The Sony World Photography Awards ceremony is annually held in London each April, and followed by an exhibition of the year's winning and shortlisted works at Somerset House in London. The artworks are then shown around the world as part of the Sony World Photography Awards Exhibition tour.

Winning photographers also share cash prizes, Sony digital imaging equipment, publication in the annual Sony World Photography Awards book. Overall and Professional category winners are also flown to the London Awards ceremony.

Photofairs

The World Photography Organisation created the Photofairs brand in 2014. Its aim is to hold boutique events of traditional still photography through to large-scale installations, video works and the cutting edge of technology.

Overview 
Photofairs present fine art photography and moving image from galleries and their artists for collectors. There are also VIP and public programs.

Photofairs takes place annually Shanghai each September and has previously help two editions in San Francisco.

Zeiss Photography Award
Launched in 2015, the Zeiss Photography Award was a collaboration between the World Photography Organisation and Zeiss.

The international photography contest annually invited photographers to submit bodies of work addressing a selected theme. All entries were free and the jury was specifically looking for artworks with a strong narrative. Winners received €12,000 worth of Zeiss lenses, €3,000 to cover travel costs for a photography project, an exhibition in London and the opportunity to work with Zeiss and the World Photography Organisation.

Past winners 
 2016: Tamina-Florentine Zuch, Germany
 2017: Kevin Faingnaert, Belgium
 2018: Nick Hannes, Belgium
2019 Rory Doyle, USA
2020: KyeongJun Yang, South Korea

References

External links
 

Photography organizations
Awards established in 2008
Photography awards